Charlie "Choo Choo" Brackins (January 12, 1932 – June 1, 1991) was  an American  former quarterback in the National Football League for the Green Bay Packers during the 1955 NFL season. Brackins is considered to be one of the first black quarterbacks to play in the NFL.

Biography
Brackins was born on January 12, 1932, in Dallas, Texas. He attended Lincoln High in Dallas.

Professional career
He played college football at Prairie View A&M University in Prairie View, Texas, from 1951 to 1955. He was a three-year starter for head football coach Billy Nicks and led the Prairie View Panthers to 33 victories in 37 games in the Southwestern Athletic Conference (SWAC). Brackins was drafted by the Green Bay Packers in the sixteenth round of the 1955 NFL Draft, making him the first HBCU alumnus to play quarterback in the NFL. He played in only one game in during the 1955 season, in the closing minutes of a game against the Cleveland Browns on October 23, 1955. Green Bay lost the game, 41–10, and Brackins threw two incomplete passes. The Packers placed Brackins on waivers after that game. Brackins had tried out as a defensive back with other teams but he never got another chance to play in the league. Brackins died from cancer in 1991.

In 2013, Brackins was elected to the Black College Football Hall of Fame.

See also

 List of Green Bay Packers players
 Racial issues faced by black quarterbacks

References

External links
 

1932 births
Living people
Players of American football from Dallas
African-American players of American football
American football quarterbacks
Prairie View A&M Panthers football players
Green Bay Packers players
21st-century African-American people
20th-century African-American sportspeople